The chapters of the manga series Boku wa Imōto ni Koi o Suru were written and illustrated by Kotomi Aoki. Originally serialized in Shōjo Comic, the individual chapters were collected and published in ten tankōbon volumes by Shogakukan, with the first volume released on May 26, 2003; and the last volume was published on August 26, 2008. The story focuses on fraternal twins Yori and Iku, who fall in love with one another despite being siblings and struggle to deal with their illicit relationship.

The series is licensed for regional language releases in France by Soleil Productions under the English title Secret Sweetheart, in Spain by Editorial Ivrea, and in Taiwan by Ever Glory Publishing. The original volumes were also imported to the United States and sold as is by Borders and Waldenbooks bookstores in early 2005. In March 2008, to celebrate its 40th anniversary, Shōjo Comic posted free chapters of Boku wa Imōto ni Koi o Suru on its website, along with a new side-story.

A spin-off series, began serialization in Shōjo Comic simultaneously in 2005. Focusing on Yori's upperclassmen Takuma Kakinouchi and his childhood sweetheart Mayu Taneda, the series ran until mid-2008. Shogakukan published the individual chapters across twelve tankōbon volumes, with the first released December 20, 2005 and the last on August 26, 2008.


Volume list

Boku wa Imōto ni Koi o Suru

Boku no Hatsukoi o Kimi ni Sasagu

References

External links
 

Boku wa Imoto ni Koi o Suru